The 1989–90 Cypriot Fourth Division was the 5th season of the Cypriot fourth-level football league. The championship was split into three geographical groups, representing the Districts of Cyprus. The winners were:
 Nicosia-Keryneia Group: Olimpiada Neapolis FC
 Larnaca-Famagusta Group: APEAN Ayia Napa
 Limassol-Paphos Group: Tsaggaris Peledriou

The three winners were promoted to the 1990–91 Cypriot Third Division. Six teams were relegated to regional leagues.

See also
 Cypriot Fourth Division
 1989–90 Cypriot First Division
 1989–90 Cypriot Cup

Cypriot Fourth Division seasons
Cyprus
1989–90 in Cypriot football